Beliops is a genus of ray-finned fish from the longfin family Plesiopidae. They are found in the western Pacific Ocean in Australia and the Philippines.

Species
There are currently two recognised species:

 Beliops batanensis Smith-Vaniz & Johnson, 1990 (Batan longfin)
 Beliops xanthokrossos Hardy, 1985 (Southern longfin)

References

Acanthoclininae